Fairview is a town in Peace Country, Alberta, Canada.

History 
In 1928, the railroad extended west from Whitelaw through the Beaver Indian Reserve across a stubble field where the Hamlet of Fairview was established. The community of Waterhole, five miles to the south, was packed onto skids and wagons and relocated to the railroad site. The first train rolled into Fairview on November 2, 1928. The hamlet was incorporated as a village on April 22, 1929. In 1949, the village was incorporated into the Town of Fairview.

Geography 
The town is one of two communities in Alberta named "Fairview"; the other is the Hamlet of Fairview in southern Alberta.

Climate 
Fairview experiences a humid continental climate (Köppen climate classification Dfb).

Demographics 

In the 2016 Census of Population conducted by Statistics Canada, the Town of Fairview recorded a population of 2,998 living in 1,251 of its 1,363 total private dwellings, a  change from its 2011 population of 3,162.

Arts and culture 

Fairview hosts the following events:
Agriculture Society Fair
Fairview & District Lions Club Annual Old Time Country Music Festival
The Annual Waterhole Pro Rodeo and Parade
Malanka Ukrainian New Year
The Peace Classic Wheels Car Show
Annual Summers End Festival
Emergency Services Regimental Ball

Attractions 

Fairview offers indoor swimming at the Fairview Aquatic Centre, golfing at the Fairview Golf Course, skating at the Fairplex, skiing at the Fairview Ski Hill, as well as curling, and bowling.

The Fairview Regional Aquatic Centre was a $3.4M collaborative project taken on by the Town of Fairview and the M.D. of Fairview No. 136. The facility has a waterslide, a zero depth wading pool, a 25m lap pool, a Tarzan swing, monkey bars, a whirlpool, and a climbing wall. The Fairview Olympians swim club is located there, and offers various programming.

Sports 
The Fairview Flyers were established in 2012, and compete in the North West Junior Hockey League.

Government 

The Town of Fairview is governed by a mayor (Gord MacLeod) and six councillors. Fairview is part of the federal electoral district of Peace River—Westlock, and is represented in the House of Commons by Arnold Viersen of the Conservative Party of Canada. Provincially, Fairview is part of the electoral district of Central Peace-Notley and is represented in the Legislative Assembly by Todd Loewen of the United Conservative Party.

Education 
Fairview has several schools, including:
St. Thomas More Catholic School (K-12)
EE Oliver School (K-6)
Fairview High School (7-12)
Grande Prairie Regional College - GPRC (Fairview Campus), formerly known as Northern Alberta Institute of Technology (NAIT), which formerly existed as Fairview College (post-secondary).

Media 
The Fairview Post is local newspaper that covers the town and surrounding area. It was founded by Hec MacLean, a renowned sportswriter who formerly worked for the Calgary Herald. It is now owned by Sun Media Corporation, under Quebecor. Fairview is also served bi-weekly by an alternative newspaper, The Vault Magazine.

Notable people 

 Jordan Peterson, cultural critic, author, clinical psychologist, and University of Toronto psychology professor.
 Rachel Notley, leader of the Alberta New Democratic Party and Premier of Alberta, 2015-2019.

See also 
List of communities in Alberta
List of towns in Alberta

References

External links 

1929 establishments in Alberta
Populated places established in 1928
Towns in Alberta